Renanthera storiei is a species of orchid endemic to the Philippines.

storiei
Orchids of the Philippines